Chandos is both a surname and a given name. Notable people with the name include:

Surname:
Fay Chandos, pen name of Irene Mossop (1904–1988), prolific British writer of children's and romance novels
John Chandos (died 1369), medieval English knight, military strategist and close friend of Edward, the Black Prince
John Chandos (actor) (1917–1987), British actor

Dynastic name:
 Duke of Chandos and Baron Chandos, England
 Viscount Chandos, United Kingdom

Given name:
Chandos Blair (1919–2011), British Army General Officer Commanding Scotland
Chandos Leigh, 1st Baron Leigh (1791–1850), British landowner and minor poet
Chandos Morgan (1920–1993), Chaplain of the Fleet and Archdeacon of the Royal Navy from 1972 to 1975
Chandos Leigh Hunt Wallace (1854–1927), English healer and writer on health, spiritualism and food reform
Chandos Wren-Hoskyns (1812–1876), English landowner, agriculturist, author and Member of Parliament

English masculine given names